Aroga temporariella is a moth of the family Gelechiidae. It is found in France and Spain.

References

Moths described in 1960
Aroga
Moths of Europe